

Mission

The 380th Electromagnetic Warfare Squadron is the reserve Associate Unit to the 16th Space Control Squadron. They jointly conduct space electronic warfare support operations to enable U.S. offensive and defensive space control capabilities. The squadrons utilize the Rapid Attack Identification Detection Reporting System Block 10 systems to rapidly achieve flexible and versatile space superiority in support of theater Unified Combatant Commands, such as European or Central Commands, and United States Strategic Command's space superiority mission.

Equipment Operated

The squadron will operate the RB-10 Central Operating Location, five RAIDRS Deployable Ground Segments. The units monitor, intercept and geolocate satellite communications jammers, sources of electromagnetic interference and other signals of interest. When fully operational, RB-10 will detect and geolocate signals in the C-, X-, Ku- and UHF frequency bands.

Rapid Attack Identification Detection Reporting System (RAIDRS) (2008–present)
SIRS

History

World War II

Activated in mid-1942 as a North American B-25 Mitchell medium bomber squadron, trained by Third Air Force in the southeastern United States.   Deployed initially to England in September 1942 and flew some missions under VIII Bomber Command over German-occupied France attacking enemy troop formations, bridges and airfields.   Was part of the Operation Torch invasion of North Africa in November 1942, being deployed to the new Mediterranean Theater of Operations, being assigned to Twelfth Air Force in French Morocco in November.  In North Africa, the squadron engaged primarily in air support and interdiction operations, bombing marshalling yards, rail lines, highways, bridges, viaducts, troop concentrations, gun emplacements, shipping, harbors, and other objectives in North Africa.

The squadron also engaged in psychological warfare missions, dropping propaganda leaflets behind enemy lines. Took part in the Allied operations against Axis forces in North Africa  during March–May 1943, the reduction of Pantelleria and Lampedusain islands during June, the invasion of Sicily in July, the landing at Salerno in September, the Allied advance toward Rome during January–June 1944, the invasion of Southern France in August 1944, and the Allied operations in northern Italy from September 1944 to April 1945.   Inactivated in Italy after the V-E Day in September 1945.

Air Force reserve
Reactivated as part of the reserve in 1947, it is unclear whether or not the squadron was manned or equipped. Inactivated in 1949.

Strategic bomber operations
Reactivated in 1952 as a Strategic Air Command squadron, receiving Boeing B-29 Superfortress bombardment training from 90th Bombardment Wing, April–August 1952.  Acted as a training squadron until 1954 when it replaced the propeller-driven B-29s with new Boeing B-47E Stratojet swept-wing medium bombers, capable of flying at high subsonic speeds and primarily designed for penetrating the airspace of the Soviet Union.  In the early 1960s, the B-47 was considered to be reaching obsolescence, and was being phased out of SAC's strategic arsenal. B-47s began being sent to AMARC at Davis-Monthan in early 1965; was inactivated in March.

Space Operations
Reactivated as the 380th Space Control Squadron in 2008, assuming the personnel and equipment of Detachment 1, 310th Space Group.  Redesignated 380th Electromagnetic Warfare Squadron in December 2022.

Lineage
 Constituted as the 380th Bombardment Squadron (Medium) on 28 January 1942
 Activated on 15 March 1942
 Redesignated 380th Bombardment Squadron, Medium on 20 August 1943
 Inactivated on 12 September 1945
 Redesignated 380th Bombardment Squadron, Light on 11 March 1947
 Activated in the reserve on 9 August 1947
 Inactivated on 27 June 1949
 Redesignated 380th Bombardment Squadron, Medium on 15 March 1952
 Activated on 28 March 1952
 Inactivated on 25 March 1965
 Redesignated 380th Space Control Squadron on 1 February 2008
 Activated on 7 March 2008
 Redesignated 380th Electromagnetic Warfare Squadron on 22 December 2022

Assignments
 310th Bombardment Group, 15 March 1942 – 12 September 1945
 310th Bombardment Group, 9 August 1947 – 27 June 1949
 310th Bombardment Wing (later 310th Strategic Aerospace Wing), 28 March 1952 – 25 March 1965
 310th Operations Group, 7 March 2008
 710th Operations Group, 1 October 2017 – present

Stations

 Davis-Monthan Field, Arizona, 15 March 1942
 Jackson Army Air Base, Mississippi, 15 March 1942
 Key Field, Mississippi, 25 April 1942
 Columbia Army Air Base, South Carolina, 16 May 1942
 Walterboro Army Air Field, South Carolina, 14 August 1942
 Greenville Army Air Base, South Carolina, 18 September – 17 October 1942 
 RAF Hardwick, England, September–November 1942 (air echelon)
 Mediouna Airfield, French Morocco, 17 November 1942
 Telergma Airfield, Algeria, c. 13 December 1942
 Berteaux Airfield, Algeria, 1 January 1943

 Dar el Koudia Airfield, Tunisia, 6 January 1943
 Menzel Temime Airfield, Tunisia, 5 August 1943 (detachment operated from Oudna Airfield, tunisia from 10 October)
 Philippeville Airfield, Algeria, 10 November 1943 (detachment continued to operate from Oudna Airfield until 19 November)
 Ghisonaccia Airfield, Corsica, France, 4 January 1944
 Fano Airfield, Italy, 7 April 1945
 Pomigliano Airfield, Italy, c. 15 August 15 – 12 September 1945
 Bedford Army Air Field, Massachusetts, 9 August 1947 
 T. F. Green Airport, Rhode Island,  4 March 1948 – 27 June 1949
 Forbes Air Force Base, Kansas, 28 March 1952
 Smoky Hill Air Force Base (later Schilling Air Force Base), Kansas, 3 September 1952 – 25 March 1965
 Peterson Air Force Base, Colorado, 7 March 2008
 Buckley Air Force Base (later Buckley Space Force Base), 1 October 2017 – present

Aircraft
 North American B-25 Mitchell, 1942–1945
 Boeing B-29 Superfortress, 1952–1954
 Boeing B-47 Stratojet, 1954–1965

Commanders

References

Notes
 Explanatory noted

 Citations

Bibography

 
 
 
 

Military units and formations in Colorado
Space Control 0380